Vlatko Hercegović (1428–1489), was the second and the last Herzog of Saint Sava,  succeeding his father Stjepan Vukčić in 1466.

Succession
After the fall of the Bosnian kingdom in 1463, herceg Stjepan Vukčić, lord of its southernmost province, lived for another three years, enough to see kingdom's complete dismantling. For this Stjepan blamed his eldest son Vladislav Hercegović. On 21 May 1466, old and terminally ill duke dictated his last words, recorded in a testament, and bypassing Vladislav he condemned him by saying that it was him who "brought the great Turk to Bosnia to the death and destruction of us all". The next day, on 22 May 1466, duke died.

Stjepan Vukčić was succeeded as herceg by his second and younger son Vlatko Hercegović, who struggled to retain as much of the territory he could.

Continued struggle
However, Blagaj, Kosača capital, fell in 1466, while Ključ fort between Nevesinje and Gacko was cut off from the main part of his territory, although Vlatko's actions against Ottomans were mostly concentrated around this fort with limited success.
A few years earlier, in August 1464, he was wounded and forced to take a refuge in the Republic of Ragusa. In 1467 he came with his Apulian bride to Ragusa.

Počitelj fell in 1471, however, herceg Vlatko already in 1470 realized that only radical change in his politics could bring him some release, so he pursued and achieved a peace with the Ottomans. In the same year, the Ottomans excluded Hum from the Bosnian Sanjak, and established a new, separate sanjak with its seat in Foča, Sanjak of Herzegovina.

The very last remnants of Bosnian state territory were these stretches of land held by Vlatko in Hum, while he moved residence to his last capital, Novi. He also gave up his agreement with Ottomans, after just a few years or so, just about the same time when his younger brother, Stjepan, assumed highest office of the Ottoman navy as Ahmed Pasha Hercegović (around 1473) in Istanbul. After his marriage in 1474, he reconciled with his older brother Vladislav.
Just before death of Sultan Mehmed II, Vlatko tried one more push to the heart of Bosnia, but abandoned by his allies his venture ended in disaster, after which he completely and finitely withdraw to his fortress in Novi.

Fall
These frequent attacks by Vlatko, and the death of Mehmed II, prompted new sultan, Bayezid II, to decide to take Novi and its harbor, along with whatever territory remained. In November 1481, Ajaz-Bey of the Sanjak of Herzegovina besieged Novi, however, just before 14th December of 1481 Vlatko gave up resisting, and agreed with the Ottomans to move with his family to Istanbul. Now entire territory of Herzegovina was reorganized into already established Sanjak of Herzegovina with the seat in Foča, and will later, in 1580, become one of the sanjaks of the Bosnia Eyalet.  This signified the ultimate disappearance of what was the last remaining independent point of the Bosnian state.

Ancestry

References

Bibliography
 
 

1420s births
1489 deaths
Ragusan nobility
Hercegović noble family